Soumyadeep Murshidabadi is an Indian singer based on Mumbai.

Career
Murshidabadi participated in a music reality show named Sur Sangam. Later he participated in another music reality named Sur Kshetra. He is trained by Ustaad Rashid Khan. He is a member of a Sufi band called Murshidabadi project.

Discography
Yogi (2020)
Mo ko kaha (2022)
Sob loke koy (2022)

References

Indian male singers
Bengali musicians
Living people
Singers from West Bengal
Year of birth missing (living people)